Fairmount Historic District is a national historic district located in the Fairmount neighborhood of York in York County, Pennsylvania.  The district includes 101 contributing buildings and 1 contributing site in a residential area of York.  The neighborhood was developed between 1889 and about 1915, and includes notable examples of the Queen Anne and Second Empire styles.

It was listed on the National Register of Historic Places in 1999.

References 

York, Pennsylvania
Historic districts on the National Register of Historic Places in Pennsylvania
Second Empire architecture in Pennsylvania
Queen Anne architecture in Pennsylvania
Historic districts in York County, Pennsylvania
National Register of Historic Places in York County, Pennsylvania